Crémazie  may refer to:

 Crémazie (Montreal Metro)
 Crémazie (electoral district)
 Octave Crémazie (1827–1879), poet
 Octave Crémazie Monument